Ravelo Manzanillo Adams (born October 17, 1963) is a former Dominican pitcher in Major League Baseball.

Career
Manzanillo played with the Chicago White Sox and Pittsburgh Pirates over parts of three seasons spanning 1988–1994. Listed at 6' 1" (1.83 m), 210 lb. (95 k), he batted and threw left-handed.

Manzanillo posted a 4–3 record with a 4.43 earned run average in 53 games for the White Sox and Pirates. He also spent 18 seasons in the Minor Leagues from 1981 to 2005, including stints in the Korea, Taiwan and Mexico baseball circuits.

In between, Manzanillo played winter ball with the Leones del Caracas club of the Venezuelan League, and for the Tigres de Licey and Leones del Escogido of the Dominican League. In addition, he served as a reinforcement for the Águilas Cibaeñas in the 1986 Caribbean Series.

Personal
His brother, Josías Manzanillo, played eleven seasons for eight teams. On June 30, 1994, they became the first pair of brothers to both earn a save on the same day.

References

Sources
, or Baseball Library, or Retrosheet, or The Baseball Gauge, or Mexican League, or Venezuelan Professional Baseball League

1963 births
Living people
Alexandria Dukes players
Birmingham Barons players
Calgary Cannons players
Chicago White Sox players
China Times Eagles players
Dominican Republic expatriate baseball players in Canada
Dominican Republic expatriate baseball players in Mexico
Dominican Republic expatriate baseball players in Taiwan
Dominican Republic expatriate baseball players in the United States
Dominican Republic expatriate baseball players in South Korea
Greenwood Pirates players
Gulf Coast Pirates players
KBO League pitchers

Leones de Yucatán players
Leones del Caracas players
Leones del Escogido players
LG Twins players
Major League Baseball pitchers
Major League Baseball players from the Dominican Republic
Massachusetts Mad Dogs players
Mexican League baseball pitchers
Nashua Pirates players
Sportspeople from San Pedro de Macorís
Pericos de Puebla players
Piratas de Campeche players
Pittsburgh Pirates players
Rojos del Águila de Veracruz players
Saraperos de Saltillo players
Sultanes de Monterrey players
Syracuse Chiefs players
Tacoma Rainiers players
Tampa White Sox players
Tigres del Licey players
Vancouver Canadians players
Dominican Republic expatriate baseball players in Venezuela